Hendrik Kraemer (born 17 May 1888 in Amsterdam, died 11 November 1965 in Driebergen) was a lay missiologist and figure in the ecumenical movement from Dutch Reformed Church in the Netherlands. He encouraged the Dutch to allow the spread missionary activities outside of the Dutch East India Company-restricted area in eastern Indonesia to the rest of the archipelago.

Biography 
Kraemer lost his parents when he was 12 years old, so he stayed in an orphanage. At the age of 16, he decided to become a missionary. Kraemer married in 1919. He learned the Bible by himself, and he never entered theological seminary.

On the question of theology of religions, Kraemer supported an exclusivist understanding of religion.

References 

1888 births
1965 deaths
Missiologists

People from Amsterdam
Dutch Protestant missionaries
Christian Peace Conference members
Dutch Reformed Church missionaries
World Christianity scholars